Wiesław Marian Chrzanowski (20 December 1923 – 29 April 2012) was a Polish politician and lawyer; from 1991 to 1993 he was Sejm Marshal. He was a recipient of the Order of the White Eagle.

Chrzanowski was born and died in Warsaw, Poland.  During World War II he was a member of the Polish anti-Nazi resistance organization, the Home Army. He finished a law degree at a secret underground university in 1945. During the second half of the 1970s he became associated with the opposition to the communist government in Poland. He helped to draft the statutes establishing the Solidarity trade union and later was the lawyer which guided the legal registration process of the organization. In 1989 he founded the Christian National Union (ZChN), party he chaired to 1994.

References

1923 births
2012 deaths
Burials at Powązki Cemetery
Politicians from Warsaw
Lawyers from Warsaw
Polish Roman Catholics
Marshals of the Sejm of the Third Polish Republic
Home Army members
National Party (Poland) politicians
Labour Party (Poland) politicians
Solidarity Electoral Action politicians
Christian National Union politicians
Warsaw Uprising insurgents
Members of the Polish Sejm 1991–1993
Members of the Senate of Poland 1997–2001
Justice ministers of Poland